Sabri Tabet (born August 17, 1977) is an Algerian retired international football player who was last playing for SO Cassis Carnoux in the French Championnat National.

International career
Tabet made his debut for the Algerian National Team on August 20, 2002 in a friendly against DR Congo in Blida. Tabet started the game and was replaced in the 80th minute, with the game ending 1-1. His second cap came less than a month later in a 2002 African Cup qualifier win (1-0) against Namibia in Windhoek. Tabet started the game and was subbed off in the 59th minute by Bouabdellah Daoud. It would be his last cap for the team.

References

1977 births
Living people
People from Rognac
French sportspeople of Algerian descent
Algerian footballers
Algeria international footballers
Association football forwards
ASOA Valence players
Clermont Foot players
En Avant Guingamp players
FC Istres players
Stade de Reims players
US Créteil-Lusitanos players
Ligue 2 players
SO Cassis Carnoux players
Sportspeople from Bouches-du-Rhône
Footballers from Provence-Alpes-Côte d'Azur